Portland Firefighters Park is a public park located in Portland, Oregon.  In 1927, the park was established, to include a memorial in honor of firefighter David Campbell.  Campbell was the fire chief for Portland and was killed in action while fighting a fire at a Union Oil distribution plant.  It was added to the U.S. National Register of Historic Places on September 24, 2010, as the David Campbell Memorial.

References

External links

1927 establishments in Oregon
Firefighters
National Register of Historic Places in Portland, Oregon
Parks in Portland, Oregon
Protected areas established in 1927
Southwest Portland, Oregon